DYXR (1395 AM) is a relay station of DZRH, owned and operated by Manila Broadcasting Company through its licensee, Cebu Broadcasting Company. The station's transmitter is located at Brgy. Tangke, Talisay, Cebu.

References

External links
DZRH FB Page
DZRH Website

Radio stations in Metro Cebu
News and talk radio stations in the Philippines
Radio stations established in 1990
DZRH Nationwide stations